Nick Wolven is an American author who writes science fiction short stories.

Education 
Wolven attended the Clarion Workshop in San Diego in 2007.

Career
Wolven's first professional sale was the short story "An Art, Like Everything Else", published in Asimov's Science Fiction April–May 2008.  It received positive reviews among bloggers  with one blogger calling it the best story in the issue.  It was called "a beautiful story with a tear-jerker ending" by Spiral Galaxy Reviews, while another said it was a "nice idea" but a "saccharine" execution. The story was republished in St Martin's Press's Year's Best Science Fiction of 2009.

Two other stories, "The LoveSling" and "Senor Hedor" also received positive reactions.

His story, "Angie's Errand", which dealt with gender issues in a post-catastrophe world, was the featured cover story for the December 2009 issue of Asimov's Science Fiction magazine. Wolven's other stories, "On the Horizon" and "Lost in the Memory Palace, I Found You," were published in the March 2010 and August 2011 issues of Asimov's Science Fiction, respectively.

Personal life 
He currently lives in Bronx, NY, and works at Barnard College Library.  As of February 1, 2010, he had stopped updating his official blog.

Wolven is also a part-time drummer. He lists Stewart Copeland as one of his major influences.

Bibliography

Short fiction 

Stories

 
 "An Art, Like Everything Else" (2008), Asimov's Science Fiction (April 2008)  
 "The LoveSling" (2008), Lady Churchill's Rosebud Wristlet (November 2008) 
 "Angie's Errand" (2009), Asimov's Science Fiction (December 2009, cover story)  
 "On the Horizon" (2010), Asimov's Science Fiction (August 2010) 
 "Radishes" (2010), Apex Magazine  
 "Lost in the Memory Palace, I Found You" (2011), Asimov's Science Fiction (March 2011)

References

Further reading 

American science fiction writers
American rock drummers
American male novelists
Asimov's Science Fiction people